Dick Palmer has been an American radio broadcaster based in Memphis, Tennessee for over fifty years.

Palmer graduated from Middle Tennessee State University in 1960.

Palmer was known as a sports announcer, including as the on air voice of the Memphis Pros, Memphis Tams and Memphis Sounds of the American Basketball Association, the Memphis Southmen (also known as the Memphis Grizzlies) of the World Football League and Middle Tennessee State University sports.

Palmer has broadcast for Memphis stations including WREC, WOWW and WGNS.

External links and references
Honoring the Distinguished Servicer of Dick Palmer
WGNS Radio
Clip of Palmer broadcast of Florida Blazers vs. Memphis Southmen WFL game, October 16, 1974
RememberTheABA.com Memphis Tams Fan Memories
Interview with Dick Palmer

American Basketball Association announcers
Memphis Sounds
Memphis Southmen
Atlanta Falcons announcers
Radio personalities from Memphis, Tennessee
World Football League announcers
College football announcers
College basketball announcers in the United States
Living people
Year of birth missing (living people)